The town of Dudley, in the West Midlands of England, has been represented in the House of Commons of the Parliament of the United Kingdom through several parliamentary constituencies:

See also 
 List of parliamentary constituencies in the West Midlands (county)

Dudley
Dudley